The Benny Goodman Sextet Featuring Charlie Christian: 1939–1941 is a jazz album by Benny Goodman and Charlie Christian. It was released in 1989.

References

1989 compilation albums
Benny Goodman albums
Charlie Christian albums
Collaborative albums